The 2002–03 Duke Blue Devils men's basketball team represented Duke University in the 2002–03 NCAA Division I men's basketball season. The head coach was Mike Krzyzewski and the team finished the season with an overall record of 26–7.

Offseason
On April 2, 2002, Krzyzewski announced that Mike Dunleavy and Chris Duhon would be captains for this season.

Schedule and results

|-
!colspan=9 style=|Regular season

 

|-
!colspan=9 style=| ACC tournament

|-
!colspan=9 style=| NCAA tournament

References

Duke
Duke Blue Devils men's basketball seasons
Duke
Duke
Duke